Herbert N. Kessler (December 28, 1912 – November 15, 1966) was a Swiss ice hockey player who competed for the Swiss national team at the 1936 Winter Olympics in Garmisch-Partenkirchen. His brother, Charles Kessler, also competed as a member of the national team at the 1936 Games.

References

External links

1912 births
1966 deaths
Ice hockey players at the 1936 Winter Olympics
Olympic ice hockey players of Switzerland
Swiss ice hockey left wingers
Sportspeople from Graubünden